Forest ecology is the scientific study of the interrelated patterns, processes, flora, fauna and ecosystems in forests. The management of forests is known as forestry, silviculture, and forest management. A forest ecosystem is a natural woodland unit consisting of all plants, animals, and micro-organisms (Biotic components) in that area functioning together with all of the non-living physical (abiotic) factors of the environment.

Importance 
Forests have an enormously important role to play in the global ecosystem. Forests produce approximately 28% of the Earth's oxygen (the vast majority being created by oceanic plankton), they also serve as homes for millions of people, and billions depend on forests in some way. Likewise, a large proportion of the world's animal species live in forests. Forests are also used for economic purposes such as fuel and wood products. Forest ecology therefore has a great impact upon the whole biosphere and human activities that are sustained by it.

Approaches 

Forests are studied at a number of organisational levels, from the individual organism to the ecosystem. However, as the term forest connotes an area inhabited by more than one organism, forest ecology most often concentrates on the level of the population, community or ecosystem. Logically, trees are an important component of forest research, but the wide variety of other life forms and abiotic components in most forests means that other elements, such as wildlife or soil nutrients, are also crucial components. 

Forest ecology shares characteristics and methodological approaches with other areas of terrestrial plant ecology, however, the presence of trees makes forest ecosystems and their study unique in numerous ways due to the potential for a wide variety of forest structures created by the uniquely large size and height of trees compared with other terrestrial plants.

Community diversity and complexity 

Since trees can grow larger than other plant life-forms, there is the potential for a wide variety of forest structures (or physiognomies). The infinite number of possible spatial arrangements of trees of varying size and species makes for a highly intricate and diverse micro-environment in which environmental variables such as solar radiation, temperature, relative humidity, and wind speed can vary considerably over large and small distances. In addition, an important proportion of a forest ecosystem's biomass is often underground, where soil structure, water quality and quantity, and levels of various soil nutrients can vary greatly. Thus, forests are often highly heterogeneous environments compared to other terrestrial plant communities. This heterogeneity in turn can enable great biodiversity of species of both plants and animals. Some structures, such as tree ferns may be keystone species for a diverse range of other species.

A number of factors within the forest affect biodiversity; primary factors enhancing wildlife abundance and biodiversity was the presence of diverse tree species within the forest and the absence of even aged timber management. For example, the wild turkey thrives when uneven heights and canopy variations exist and its numbers are diminished by even aged timber management.

Forest management techniques that mimic natural disturbance events (variable retention forestry) can allow community diversity to recover rapidly for a variety of groups including beetles.

Ecological facilitation 
In forests, trees and shrubs often serve as nurse plants that facilitate the establishment and seedling growth of understory plants. The forest canopy protects young understory plants from extremes of temperature and dry conditions. Another major example of ecological facilitation that is common in forests is the mycorrhizal network, which consists of fungi and plants that share symbiotic relationships. Through the mycorrhizal network, resources can be transmitted from plant to plant.

Ecological potential of forest species 
The ecological potential of a particular species is a measure of its capacity to effectively compete in a given geographical area, ahead of other species, as they all try to occupy a natural space. For some areas it has been quantified, as for instance by Hans-Jürgen Otto, for central Europe. He takes three groups of parameters:

Related to site requirements: Tolerance to low temperatures, tolerance to dry climate, frugality.
Specific qualities: Shade tolerance, height growth, stability, longevity, regeneration capacity.
Specific risks: Resistance to late freezing, resistance to wind/ice storm, resistance to fire, resistance to biotic agents.

Every parameter is scored between 0 and 5 for each considered species, and then a global mean value calculated. A value above 3.5 is considered high, below 3.0 low, and intermediate for those in between. In this study Fagus sylvatica has a score of 3.82, Fraxinus excelsior 3.08 and Juglans regia 2.92; and are examples of the three categories.

Matter and energy flows

Energy flux 

Forests accumulate large amounts of standing biomass, and many are capable of accumulating it at high rates, i.e. they are highly productive. Such high levels of biomass and tall vertical structures represent large stores of potential energy that can be converted to kinetic energy under the right circumstances.

The world’s forests contain about 606 gigatonnes of living biomass (above- and below-ground) and 59 gigatonnes of dead wood.

Two such conversions of great importance are fires and treefalls, both of which radically alter the biota and the physical environment where they occur. Also, in forests of high productivity, the rapid growth of the trees themselves induces biotic and environmental changes, although at a slower rate and lower intensity than relatively instantaneous disturbances such as fires.

Water 
Forest trees store large amounts of water because of their large size and anatomical/physiological characteristics.  They are therefore important regulators of hydrological processes, especially those involving groundwater hydrology and local evaporation and rainfall/snowfall patterns.

An estimated 399 million ha of forest is designated primarily for the protection of soil and water, an increase of 119 million ha since 1990.

Thus, forest ecological studies are sometimes closely aligned with meteorological and hydrological studies in regional ecosystem or resource planning studies. Perhaps more importantly the duff or leaf litter can form a major repository of water storage. When this litter is removed or compacted (through grazing or human overuse), erosion and flooding are exacerbated as well as deprivation of dry season water for forest organisms.

Death and regeneration 

Woody material, often referred to as coarse woody debris, decays relatively slowly in many forests in comparison to most other organic materials, due to a combination of environmental factors and wood chemistry (see lignin). Trees growing in arid and/or cold environments do so especially slowly. Thus, tree trunks and branches can remain on the forest floor for long periods, affecting such things as wildlife habitat, fire behaviour, and tree regeneration processes.

Some trees leave behind eerie skeletons after death. In reality these deaths are actually very few compared to the amount of tree deaths that go unnoticed. Thousands of seedlings can be produced from a single tree but only a few can actually grow to maturity. Most of those deaths are caused from competition for light, water, or soil nutrients, this is called natural thinning. Singular deaths caused by natural thinning go unnoticed, but many deaths can help form forest ecosystems. There are four stages to forest regrowth after a disturbance, the establishment phase which is rapid increase in seedlings, the thinning phase which happens after a canopy is formed and the seedlings covered by it die, the transition phase which occurs when one tree from the canopy dies and creates a pocket of light giving new seedlings opportunity to grow, and lastly the steady-state phase which happens when the forest has different sizes and ages of trees.

See also 
Clear cutting
Close to nature forestry
Deforestation and climate change
Forest Ecology and Management (journal)
Forest Principles
Intact forest landscapes
Mountain ecology
Old-growth forest
Plant ecology
Regeneration (ecology)

References

Bibliography 

 Philip Joseph Burton. 2003. Towards sustainable management of the boreal forest 1039 pages
 Robert W. Christopherson. 1996. Geosystems: An Introduction to Physical Geography. Prentice Hall Inc.
 C. Michael Hogan. 2008. Wild turkey: Meleagris gallopavo, GlobalTwitcher.com, ed. N. Stromberg
 James P. Kimmins. 2054. Forest Ecology: a foundation for sustainable forest management and environmental ethics in forestry, 3rd Edit. Prentice Hall, Upper Saddle River, NJ, USA. 611 pages

Copyright notice